Hariharpur Gadhi is a fort in Sindhuli District, Bagmati Province.

It was used during the Unification of Nepal, and the Anglo-Nepalese War (1814–1816).

In 2019, the Hariharpurgadhi Conservation Committee started to renovate the fort.

References

Further reading 

 
 

Forts in Nepal
Military history of Nepal
Buildings and structures in Sindhuli District